Al-Shabaab or Al-Shabab (الشباب ash-Shabāb) is an Arabic phrase meaning "the Youth". It may refer to:

Association football 
Al Shabab Al Arabi Club Beirut, a Lebanese association football club
Al Shabab Al Arabi Club Dubai, an Emirati former association football club
Al-Shabab Club (Manama), a football club in Bahrain
Al-Shabab FC (Riyadh), a football club in Saudi Arabia
Al-Shabab SC (Al Ahmadi), a football club in Kuwait
Al-Shabab SC (Baghdad), a football club in Iraq
Al-Shabab SC (Seeb), a football club in Oman
Al-Shabab SC (Syria), a football club in Raqqa, Syria
Chabab Ghazieh SC, a Lebanese football club
Shabaab al Jabal, a Libyan football club
Shabab Al Sahel FC, a Lebanese football club
Shabab El-Bourj SC, a Lebanese football club
Shabab Rafah, a Palestinian football club
Muaither SC, a Qatari football club previously known as Al Shahab

Groups 
Al-Shabaab (militant group), a Somalia-based militant Islamist group aligned with Al-Qaeda
Ash-Shabab al-Mu'min, a Zaidi Shia insurgent group operating in Yemen commonly known as the Houthis
Ansar al-Sunna (Mozambique), a rebel group also known as al-Shabaab

Locations
RNOV Shabab Oman, a pair of vessels in the Royal Omani Navy
Shabab Rural District, an administrative subdivision of Iran
Shabab, Iran, a city in Iran

Other 
Shabaab (film), a 1954 Indian film